Guti (born 1976) is a Spanish footballer.

Guti may also refer to:
 Gutian people or Guti, a nomadic people of West Asia in ancient times
 Franklin Gutiérrez or Guti (born 1983), Venezuelan baseball player 
 Guti (footballer, born 1988), Spanish footballer
 Guti (Brazilian footballer) (born 1991)
 Raúl Guti  (born 1996), Spanish footballer
 Guti (footballer, born 1999), Spanish footballer

People with the surname
 Ezekiel Guti (born 1923), a Zimbabwean pastor

See also
 Gooty, a town in Anantapur district of the Indian state of Andhra Pradesh
 Gutes, a North Germanic tribe inhabiting the island of Gotland
 Gutones, possibly early Goths